Group C of the 2012 Fed Cup Europe/Africa Zone Group I was one of four pools in the Europe/Africa zone of the 2012 Fed Cup. Three teams competed in a round robin competition, with the top team and the bottom team proceeding to their respective sections of the play-offs: the top team played for advancement to the World Group II Play-offs, while the bottom team faced potential relegation to Group II.

Netherlands vs. Israel

Great Britain vs. Portugal

Netherlands vs. Great Britain

Israel vs. Portugal

Netherlands vs. Portugal

Israel vs. Great Britain

References

External links 
 Fed Cup website

2012 Fed Cup Europe/Africa Zone